Drug Target Insights is a peer-reviewed open access academic journal focusing on drug treatment targets and clinical therapeutics. The journal was founded in 2006 by Monica Milani and is currently edited by Giulio Zuanetti. It was originally published by Libertas Academica, but SAGE Publications became the publisher in September 2016. In 2020, the journal was transferred to AboutScience Srl.

Indexing
The journal is abstracted and indexed in the following bibliographic databases:
Academic Search Premier
DOAJ
EMBASE
Emerging Sources Citation Index
Scopus
According to Scopus, it has a 2020 CiteScore of 4.6, ranking 11th out of 67th in the category 'General Pharmacology, Toxicology and Pharmaceutics'.

References

External links

Pharmacology journals
Publications established in 2006
English-language journals
Open access journals